Colonel Lawrence A. Corcoran was a Defense Intelligence Agency officer stationed in Santiago, Chile in the early 1970s.

References

Possibly living people
Year of birth missing
American spies
People of the Defense Intelligence Agency